Otto Liebmann (25 February 1840 – 14 January 1912) was a German neo-Kantian philosopher.

Biography
He was born at Löwenberg, Silesia, into a Jewish family, and educated at Leipzig and Halle. He was made professor at Strassburg (1872) and went to Jena in 1882. He died at Jena. The mathematician Heinrich Liebmann was his son.

Philosophical work
A forerunner of neo-Kantianism, in his best-known book, Kant und die Epigonen, he deals with the philosophy after Kant, discussing Fichte, Schelling, Hegel, Fries, Herbart and Schopenhauer. Having credited Kant's philosophy (though criticizing it on the vital point of accepting a thing-in-itself), he focuses on what he sees as the shortcomings in the approaches of Kants successors. He frequently ends a section with the statement that one should return to Kant.

Liebmann's work also influenced his Jena colleague Gottlob Frege.

Works
Kant und die Epigonen, a critique of the followers of Kant urging a return to their master (1865) (Kant and his inferior successors)
Ueber die Freiheit des Willens (1866) (On free will)
Ueber den objektiven Anblick (1869) (On the objective point of view)
Vier Monate vor Paris, a journal published anonymously (1871)
Zur Analysis der Wirklichkeit (1876; 3rd ed. 1900) (About the analysis of actuality)
Die Klimax der Theorien (1884) (The climax of theory)
Geist der Transcendentalphilosophie (1901)
Grundriss der kritischen Metaphysik (1901) (Outline of critical metaphysics)
Gedanken und Tatsachen, 2 Bände (1882–1904) (Thoughts and facts)

References

External links
 
 

1840 births
1912 deaths
19th-century German Jews
Jewish philosophers
19th-century German philosophers
University of Halle alumni
Leipzig University alumni
Academic staff of the University of Strasbourg
Academic staff of the University of Jena
German male writers